For the Punx is the debut studio album by The Casualties, released in 1997.

Track listing
For The Punx - 2:34
Ugly Bastards - 1:40
City Life - 2:26
Riot - 1:42
Casualties - 1:39
Who's Gonna Be... - 2:21
Police Brutality - 1:46
Punx & Skins - 1:34
Destruction & Hate - 1:52
Two Faced - 1:42
Chaos Punx - 2:08
Punk Rock Love - 1:49

1997 debut albums
The Casualties albums
Punk rock albums by American artists